Craig Allen Kelly (born 1953) is a United States diplomat. He was US Ambassador to Chile from 2004 to 2007.

Education
Ambassador Kelly attended Servite High School (Anaheim, California) and UCLA. He holds a PhD in Romance Languages and European History.

Languages
Ambassador Kelly  speaks Spanish, Italian, French and Portuguese.

References

1953 births
Living people
Place of birth missing (living people)
University of California, Los Angeles alumni
United States Department of State officials
Ambassadors of the United States to Chile
People from Anaheim, California
Servite High School alumni
Fulbright alumni